Austria competed at the 2017 World Championships in Athletics in London, United Kingdom, 4–13 August 2017.

Results

Men
Track and road events

Field events

Combined events – Decathlon

Women
Combined events – Heptathlon

Nations at the 2017 World Championships in Athletics
World Championships in Athletics
2017